Parul Chaudhary (born 15 April 1995) is an Indian athlete who specializes in 5000 metres and 3000 metres steeplechase.
She is the first Indian runner to clock a sub-9 minute time in the women’s 3000m.

References

External links
 

1995 births
Living people
Indian female long-distance runners
Place of birth missing (living people)
World Athletics Championships athletes for India